Chyorny Yar (lit. black bluff) is a rural locality (a selo) and the administrative center of Chernoyarsky District of Astrakhan Oblast, Russia, located on the elevated right bank of the Volga River. Population:    7,642 (1899 est.).

It was established as a fort on the left bank of the Volga in 1627. Seven years later, it was moved to the opposite bank. In 1785, it was designated an uyezd town. The stanitsa of Chernoyarskaya used to be an important center of the Astrakhan Cossack Host. In 1925, it was demoted in status to that of a rural locality.

References

External links
Website of Chyorny Yar

Rural localities in Chernoyarsky District
Astrakhan Governorate
Former cities in Russia
Populated places established in 1627
1627 establishments in Russia